Bandini Automobili was an Italian automobile manufacturer operating between 1946 and 1992. It was named after its founder Ilario Bandini.

History
Founded in 1946 in Bandini’s hometown Forlì, the first Bandini used a modified Fiat 1100 engine, the body was made from hand hammered aluminium and the chassis from aviation-grade tubular steel. Many other post-war Italian sports car companies followed a similar design. But Bandini’s sharp mind, racing knowledge and his eye for detail ensured that Bandini cars were a force to be reckoned with in Europe and the US.

Interest in America surged when Bandini Siluros, with their screaming 750-cc engines and wildly flared front fenders, won SCCA class championships in 1955 and 1957. His slightly modified Crosley engines became famous thanks their DOHC Bandini heads. Bandini himself continued to race in Italy, including the Mille Miglia, while newer models were being built and developed at the factory. One of these included the new 1957 Sport International "Saponetta". It was a two-seat sports car with a tubular steel frame and room for engines of up to 1.0 litre. The design of the car body was very striking. The smooth lines and petite dimensions gave the car the Italian nickname "Saponetta" (little soap). The Formula 3 car of 1954 had disc brakes on all four wheels, following closely on the 1951 C-type Jaguar. The Zagato bodied Bandini GT raced in Daytona and 12 Hours of Sebring.  The coupé by Corna was a 1000 cc and the engine was mounted in front.

Racing history

Ilario divided his time between design and manufacturing of the cars, and as a race driver. He entered and drove his cars in more than 60 races, both hillclimb events and track racing, including the Mille Miglia from 1947 until 1965, achieving 19 first-place finishes and 18 podiums in the 750cc and 1000cc classes.

In the United States, Bandini cars won the SCCA HM class championship in 1955 thanks to driver Dolph Vilardi.  In 1957 Melvin Sachs won the HM class, one of five Bandini's in the first ten positions. The successes resulted in Ilario being presented with the Gold Key of Daytona and later in 1981 the Laurea H.C. award in mechanical engineering from PRODEO university of New York. In 1959 he produced one of the most successful Formula Juniors.  Bandinis won SCCA Class HMod races well into the mid-1960s. A Bandini Siluro won the SCCA Southwest Regional Championship from 1961–1963 and the Saponetta took 3rd place in the National Hmod class in 1961.  Bandini continued to make one-off cars well into the 1980s. Ilario, sometimes known as the "great Drake of Forli" died in 1992.

Memorial to Ilario Bandini

On 16 November 2002 the city of Forlì, Italy remembered Ilario Bandini who is considered one of the most important Italian constructors of performance sports and race cars. The city dedicated a plaza (town square) to honor his name and the racing cars that bear his name.

Bandini Museum and Register
Since 1992, in Bandini's last workshop, Ilario's family has preserved all documents and collected the most representative cars for display. Ten Bandinis are in the museum and are shown by appointment.  46 Bandinis exist in the world today and are acknowledged by the Register.  They are owned from the U.S. to Japan.

Models
 "La prima" 1100/46 (1946)
 1100 sport (1947–50)
 1100 siluro (1947–49)
 750 sport siluro (1950–56)
 Bandini-Maserati 1500 (1952)
 formula 3 (1954–58)
 berlinetta Zagato (1955)
 750 sport internazionale "saponetta" (1957–61)
 formula junior (1959–62)
 1000/62 P (1962–65)
 1000 GT (1963)
 1000/66 sport (1966)
 saloncino (1968)
 1000/70 V (1970)
 mille s.p. (1972)
 1300 16 V i. (1980)
 berlinetta 1000 turbo (1992)

See also

 Bandini GT
 Ilario Bandini

References

External links

Current Italian Official Website
Bandini info on Wheels Of Italy
Etceterini.com
Bandini page on sports.racer.net
Bandini Collection info

 
Defunct motor vehicle manufacturers of Italy
Sports car manufacturers
Vehicle manufacturing companies established in 1946
Italian racecar constructors
Sports cars
World Sportscar Championship teams
Italian auto racing teams
Vehicle manufacturing companies disestablished in 1992
1992 disestablishments in Italy
Italian companies established in 1946